

Brownlow KI is a locality in the Australian state of South Australia located on the north coast of Kangaroo Island overlooking the body of water known as Nepean Bay about  south of the state capital of  Adelaide and about  south of the municipal seat of Kingscote.

The name was first used for a government town which was surveyed in January 1882 and proclaimed during June 1882.  Boundaries for the locality which include the former government town were created in March 2002 for the “long established name.”  The name is reported as being derived from Field Marshal Sir Charles Henry Brownlow.  The abbreviation “KI” was added during May 2002 in order to avoid confusion with the locality of Brownlow located within both the Mid Murray Council and the Regional Council of Goyder.

The principal land use within the locality is residential accommodation while a strip of land along its coastline is zoned for conservation.

Brownlow KI is located within the federal division of Mayo, the state electoral district of Mawson and the local government area of the Kangaroo Island Council.

See also
Brownlow (disambiguation)

References

Towns on Kangaroo Island